Dankerode is a village and a former municipality in the district of Harz, Saxony-Anhalt, Germany. Since 1 August 2009, it is part of the town Harzgerode. It lies in the Unterharz, the eastern region of the Harz mountains, at an elevation of 420 m above the valley of the Wipper and has over 1000 years of rich history.

References

Former municipalities in Saxony-Anhalt
Harzgerode